Sooke Mountain Provincial Park is a Class B provincial park located at the southern end of Vancouver Island in British Columbia, Canada. The park was established on June 25, 1928, to protect local wildlife and preserve the scenic wilderness of the area. Sooke Mountain is now part of the larger Sea to Sea Green Blue Belt surrounding Greater Victoria.

History
The park was originally used as a wilderness destination by the Canadian Pacific Railway where visitors could stay at a private lodge overlooking Sheilds Lake. The lodge burned down in the 1960s with only its brick foundation remaining.

The park and its neighbouring properties was logged during the 1950s.

Activities
The park is largely undeveloped with no park facilities. Fishing, hunting, and backcountry hiking are popular activities. Off-road vehicles are prohibited within the park.

See also
Sooke Potholes Provincial Park
Strathcona-Westmin Provincial Park

References

External links

Greater Victoria
Provincial parks of British Columbia
Protected areas established in 1928
1928 establishments in British Columbia